Buckingham Apartments was a historic apartment building located in downtown Evansville, Indiana.  It was designed by the architecture firm Shopbell & Company and built in 1911. It was in Arts and Crafts movement style architecture. It was demolished on November 18, 1998

It was listed on the National Register of Historic Places in 1982 and delisted in 2011.

References

Former National Register of Historic Places in Indiana
Apartment buildings in Indiana
Residential buildings on the National Register of Historic Places in Indiana
Residential buildings completed in 1911
Buildings and structures in Evansville, Indiana
National Register of Historic Places in Evansville, Indiana